Bank Aljazira aka BAJ is a Saudi Arabian financial group and a joint-stock company founded in 1975 headquartered in Jeddah.

Overview 
Bank Aljazira was established as a Saudi joint-stock company registered under Royal Decree No. 46/M issued on June 21, 1975. The bank began its operations on October 9, 1976, after it acquired the branches of the National Bank of Pakistan in the Kingdom of Saudi Arabia. In 2010, the foundations were laid for future growth and diversification of the bank’s products and services,  which contributed to the diversification of income sources away from the risks of relying on one or two sources of income.

History

References

See also 
List of companies of Saudi Arabia

Banks established in 1975
Islamic banks of Saudi Arabia
1975 establishments in Saudi Arabia